GP2, GP.2, GP-2 or variant, may refer to:

British GP2, a motorcycle race classification within the British Supersport Championship
 GP2 Series, an open wheel motor racing series that was succeeded by the FIA Formula 2 Championship
 GP2 Asia Series, a similar series that ran in Asia from 2008 to 2011, before merging with the main GP2 Series
 GP2 (gene), a human gene
 Grand Prix 2, a racing simulator game
 Asiago GP.2, glider
 González Gil-Pazó GP-2, airplane

 Gary Payton II, American basketball player

See also

 Moto2, motorcycle GP class 2
 
 GPGP (disambiguation)
 GPP (disambiguation)
 GP (disambiguation)